Afghanistan participated in the 2017 Asian Indoor and Martial Arts Games in Ashgabat, Turkmenistan from 17 to 27 September 2017.

Medal winners

References

Nations at the 2017 Asian Indoor and Martial Arts Games
2017 in Afghan sport
Afghanistan at the Asian Games